The 2015–16 season was Huddersfield Town's fourth consecutive season in the Championship and 107th year in existence. Along with competing in the Championship, the club participated in the FA Cup and League Cup. The season covers the period from 1 July 2015 to 30 June 2016.

On 9 November 2015, following the departure of Chris Powell a few days earlier, the German-American David Wagner became the first head coach of the club, and the first to be born outside the British Isles in the club's 107-year history.

Squad at the start of the season

Kit
The 2015–16 season was the club's third with technical kit supplier Puma. Pure Legal Limited became main sponsors of the home kit, taking over from previous sponsor Rekorderlig Cider, while Radian B & Covonia continued their sponsorships of the away and third shirts, respectively.

A special charity kit was worn for the home match vs Birmingham City in aid of the Town Foundation, and was sponsored by Johnstone's Paint.

|
|
|
|
|
|
|
|
|

Squad at the end of the season

Transfers

Transfers in

Total spending:  £300,000

Transfers out

Total income:  £3,500,000

Loans in

Loans out

Squad statistics

Appearances and goals

|}

Top scorers

Cards

Competitions

Pre-season friendlies
On 15 May 2015, Huddersfield Town announced their first pre-season friendly ahead of the 2015–16 season against Guiseley. On 19 May 2015, a second friendly was announced against Barnsley. A day later, Huddersfield Town announced they will travel to Grimsby Town. A fourth friendly was announced on 21 May 2015 against Rochdale. On 1 July 2015, Huddersfield Town announced they will face Leyton Orient on 18 July 2015 in Spain. On 7 July 2015, Huddersfield Town finalised their pre-season schedule by confirming a home friendly against Spanish side Deportivo de La Coruña.

Overview

Championship

Results summary

Results by round

League table

Matches
On 17 June 2015, the fixtures for the forthcoming season were announced.

Score overview

Note: Huddersfield goals are listed first.

FA Cup
On 7 December 2015, the third round draw was made, Huddersfield Town were drawn at home against Reading, in a repeat of the third round tie the previous season.

League Cup
On 16 June 2015, the first round draw was made, Huddersfield Town were drawn at home against Notts County.

References

Huddersfield Town
Huddersfield Town A.F.C. seasons